This is a list of lighthouses in Tunisia, which are located along the Mediterranean coastline, and on a number of Tunisian islands. The list includes those marine lighthouses that are named landfall lights, or have a range of at least fifteen nautical miles.

Lighthouses

See also
List of lighthouses in Algeria (to the west)
List of lighthouses in Libya (to the east)
Lists of lighthouses and lightvessels

References

External links

 

Tunisia
Lighthouse
Lighthouses